Empire Exhibition, Scotland 1938 was an international exposition held at Bellahouston Park in Glasgow, from May to December 1938.

The Exhibition offered a chance to showcase and boost the economy of Scotland, and celebrate Empire trade and developments, recovering from the depression of the 1930s. It also marked fifty years since Glasgow's first great exhibition, the International Exhibition (1888) held at Kelvingrove Park. It was the second British Empire Exhibition, the first having been held at Wembley Park, London in 1924 and 1925.

Its function was similar to the first National Exhibition in Paris in 1798, and to the first International Exhibition, the Great Exhibition in London in 1851 attended by 6 million visitors.

It was declared open by King George VI and Queen Mary on 3 May 1938 at the Opening Ceremony in Ibrox Stadium, attended by 146,000 people.

In addition to the Royal Patrons and the Honorary Presidents representing governments and institutions here and in the Dominions, the Exhibition President was the Earl of Elgin who was also President of the Scottish Development Council, initiators of the exposition.

The Exhibition Objects
The exhibition promoted five Objects, the fifth being included to counter the thinking in fascist countries in Europe and Asia:
  To illustrate the progress of the British Empire at home and overseas.
  To show the resources and potentialities of the United Kingdom and the Empire overseas to the new generation.
  To stimulate Scottish work and production and to direct attention to Scotland`s historical and scenic attractions.
  To foster Empire trade and a closer friendship among the peoples of the British Commonwealth of Nations.
  To emphasize to the world the peaceful aspirations of the peoples of the British Empire.

The event

Although 1938 was one of the wettest summers on record, the Exhibition attracted 12,800,000 visitors, despite not being open on a Sunday.

Exhibition pavilions and leisure and recreation buildings were erected on the site, the two largest commercial pavilions being the Palace of Engineering and Palace of Industry, and countries in the British Empire contributed their own national pavilions. The Exhibition was master-planned by Thomas S. Tait, who headed a team of architects, which included Basil Spence and Jack Coia.

Although it could have remained as a permanent monument after the exhibition, the tower was handed over to the British Army after the exhibition ended and was demolished in June 1939. The rumour that the structure was demolished to avoid it being used as a reference point by German bombers is an urban myth. The nearby Gilmorehill tower at Glasgow University could potentially have been used for the same purpose, but it was not demolished.

Origins
The idea of the exhibition came from the Scottish Development Council, created in the 1930s, under the aegis of its founder chairman Sir James Lithgow, industrialist and Britain`s foremost shipbuilder. Cecil Weir, convenor of the Council`s general purposes committee made the suggestion, at Lithgow’s behest,  and gave shape to the idea. In 1936 his report and proposals were announced. In a few months’ time after meeting government bodies , industries and manufacturers the Empire Exhibition project was officially launched in October 1936 in the Merchants House, Glasgow.

Glasgow Corporation leased to the Exhibition  of the sylvan and well-wooded Bellahouston Park, free of rent, leaving them  of city nursery. The oval-shaped hill in the park would prove ideal for the Festival Tower and for the fountains and water cascades on both sides. Nearby, Ibrox Park stadium, home of Rangers F.C., was made available as the venue for the Exhibition`s programme of sporting events and competitions.

Another Council initiative of the time was the creation of the Scottish Industrial Estates corporation chaired by Sir Steven Bilsland, bread manufacturer and chairman of the Union Bank of Scotland. Scotland`s first new estate, Hillington Industrial Estate, just a mile or so away would soon start construction. The new body would expand across the country, and in 1979 merged with the new Scottish Development Agency.

While national and international committees were formed to include as many as possible in areas such as buildings, science and technology, accommodation, publicity, film, arts, entertainments and events, the council of management and administrative committee took most of the strain. Both were chaired by Sir Cecil Weir (knighted in June 1938).  His colleagues knew him as wee Cecil and the public soon knew the exposition as Cecil`s Exhibition.
The Scottish Development Council "inner cabinet" of four met almost daily, comprising: Sir Cecil Weir, Exhibition Convenor; Norman Hird, Convenor of Finance, general manager of the Union Bank of Scotland; James Barr, Convenor of Buildings, civil engineer and surveyor; and Sir Steven Bilsland, Convenor of the Publicity & Contacts Committee. Captain J. Sidney Graham of the Government`s Exhibition Department was appointed general manager.

Sir Cecil Weir
The enterprising Cecil M Weir, fluent in French and German, was chairman of the international leather firm of Schrader, Mitchell & Weir,  headquartered in Glasgow, from where his elder brother John Weir had become UK Controller of Leather in WWI. An active member of the Liberal Party, he advocated social and economic reform. He would become president of Glasgow Chamber of Commerce and later a founder of the Institute of Production Engineers. He was appointed the first Civil Defence Commissioner for Western Scotland, receiving his sealed orders at the Exhibition on 25 September 1938, five days before Chamberlain arrived back from Munich. Throughout WWII he was one of the five members of the UK Industrial & Export Council.  He was also made Controller of Factory  & Storage Premises and then Director General of Equipment & Stores with supreme control over all production. He introduced the policy of the Concentration of British Industry which freed up 70 million square feet of premises, and 260,000 male workers for active service, resulting in greatly improved efficiency and production and the training of women workers. Of his many initiatives here and jointly with his American counterpart, Weir introduced the mass production of penicillin, essential to the survival of Allied service personnel; industrial-scale production of the pressed-steel jerrican for the Allies, based on the Nazi invention , the war being global and fast moving in contrast to trench-warfare; and ahead of peacetime conceived the scheme of Demobilisation Clothing for 9 million service men and women, and with no distinction for rank. In 1943 he headed The Weir Report to Churchill's government recommending the creation of a Design Council to support Britain's economic recovery. The Design Council was formed in December 1944, with Design Centres opening in the post-war years in major conurbations.
 
In 1944 and 1945 he landed in France and the Low Countries, behind the Allied advance, as joint head of the Weir-Green Commission of the UK and USA assessing how best to restart the industries of these countries, to support the war effort and their liberation, with willing and freed people.  From 1946 to 1949 he was President of the Economic Commission headquartered in Berlin and Hanover under the British Military Governor of occupied Germany. With a staff of some 7,000, Sir Cecil Weir had absolute power over the population, industries and commerce in what would become West Germany with a new capital Bonn, where he had completed his schooling. On his return to the UK he became chairman of the Dollar Exports Board and, among other companies, the chairman of the first British computer manufacturing company, ICT.

Design & Construction
The appointment of the highly respected and unassuming Thomas Smith Tait of Sir John Burnet, Tait and Partners as Chief Architect was masterly. Paisley-born Tait had no experience of previous exhibitions but was now a senior partner in the international firm of Sir John Burnet, Tait and Lorne, of London and Scotland. He devised the master plan in conjunction with the consulting engineers Crouch & Hogg of Glasgow and determined that the building style would be Art Deco. He designed most of the 100 buildings. A condition of his appointment was that he would also engage and be assisted by members of the younger set of Scottish architects. Those chosen were: Margaret Brodie, Jack Coia, Esme Gordon, Alistair MacDonald, Thomas W Marwick, Mervyn Noad, Launcelot Ross, Basil Spence, Dr Colin Sinclair, and James Taylor Thomson. Many had experience of the Burnet firm or American experience.

The British and the Dominion governments, Canada, Australia, New Zealand, South Africa, Burma and Ireland and the Colonial governments could appoint their own architect for their pavilions, assisted by the guidance of Tommy Tait.  West Africa, Southern Rhodesia and East Africa had their pavilions and fifteen other Colonies came together in a composite Colonial Pavilion.  The largest national pavilion was the ultra-modern British Government Pavilion designed by Herbert Rowse of Liverpool. In addition to the main Industrial and Engineering Halls, Commonwealth pavilions and cultural exhibits there were no-less than sixty-two pavilions erected by famous commercial and industrial concerns. The Empire Exhibition had the first-ever major dancing water fountains built, for its lakes and cascades. They were also floodlit and changed colours.

Sir Cecil Weir records "Lord Inverclyde, chairman of Cunard, toured round the playgrounds and holiday resorts of Britain in search of what we wanted, the masses of restaurants to suit every purse, the bandstands, the fashion shows in the special theatre in the Women of Empire Pavilion designed by Margaret Brodie, and the innumerable events which took place in the Ibrox Park Stadium, including a week of a Services Tournament, similar to the Royal Military , giving a character to this Exhibition which was comprehensive and unique". Of the many restaurants, including the Treetops Restaurant of the Tower, the de-luxe Atlantic Restaurant on the ridge of the hill was built and operated by the Anchor Line, designed as the bow and superstructure of a liner.

The first sod was turned in March 1937, ceremoniously by Countess Elgin. Different from previous exhibitions, all roads and walkways were made up to highway standards and all services were below ground. Above-ground construction started in July 1937 when King George VI and Queen Elizabeth unveiled the granite Commemoration Stone on the hill, where it remains today.  The total area of buildings was well over I million square feet. Construction was of steel and timber, throughout clad in four-foot-square asbestos panels, the idea being drawn from Mendelsohn and Chermayeff’s Bexhill Pavilion built in 1935, for which Tait had been the assessor. The permanent Palace of Art was built of brick. Construction at Bellahouston was completed in 10 months, making it a record for international exhibitions.

Exhibits & Events
Sir Cecil Weir writes "The British Commonwealth and the Colonies were as ably presented as the Mother Country herself. The lovely pavilions in Dominion and Colonial Avenues in Empire Court, separated by a beautiful ornamental lake and fountains with the great Engineering Hall at one end and the Industrial Halls at the other, flanked by innumerable pavilions erected by great industrial companies, newspapers and public services grouped below the terrace approach to the Garden Club and the Tower gave the plan a grace and variety which took full advantage of the beauty of the natural features with which the site abounded. On the other side of the Hill with its dominating Tower lay the Scottish pavilions, the Highland Village or Clachan, the Palace of Arts, the Peace and Fitness Pavilions and the Concert Hall along with a number of smaller pavilions of a private character. Three fine new churches were well attended throughout the run of the Exhibition. The Commonwealth and its myriad resources and customs came to life in these exhibits. The Exhibition could fairly be dubbed as much an exhibition of industrial achievement as of culture and the arts."

Nineteen restaurants, and numerous milk and snack bars, met the appetites of visitors from Britain and overseas, who for transport around the vast site had use of fifty Lister passenger autotrucks quietly traversing the roadways on a one-way route, linking pavilions, and passing the well-used bandstands. Ten thousand were carried each day.  The Concert Hall – from which the BBC broadcast - staged classical concerts, jazz, dance bands, and variety billings arranged by Messrs Collins Variety Agency, and the Film Theatre presented newsreels, documentaries and cartoons. At other times its stage was used for drama, under the guidance of James Bridie, and for choral concerts.

There were frequent displays by the Army, Navy and Air Force, pipe band competitions and massed band parades and open-air dancing. The Amusement Park, with its sub-franchise of the Big Ride (or Mountain Railway),  was highly successful with its 28 large devices and 105 side-shows and games. An international football tournament was held throughout the summer for the Empire Exhibition Trophy, being won by Celtic, with Everton as runners up. The number of spectators totalled 340,000, a figure not added in to the main Exhibition attendances. A total of 87 national and international Congresses and Conferences were held, usually in the Concert Hall and its committee rooms, with smaller conferences held in the Castle Hall in the Clachan, and in the Fashion Theatre.

Legacy buildings
The only major surviving original structure on the site is the Palace of Arts, designed by Launcelot H Ross, and now used for sporting and health activities. The Palace of Engineering was dismantled in 1940, transported to Scottish Aviation at Prestwick and re-erected, dramatically increasing the company's factory floor space. The building is still used by aviation industry today and is a distinctive feature at Prestwick Airport. The former South Africa pavilion with its distinctive curvilinear Dutch Baroque gables also survives. Built as a temporary structure, the building was later moved to Ardeer in Ayrshire to become a staff canteen within ICI Ardeer. The Empire News Theatre, which showed films and newsreels, with a small stage for live performance, was re-erected in Lochgilphead in 1939 as a cinema. In 1991 it became a travel lodge. The highland Clachan was shipped to San Francisco. Billy Butlin bought the Concert Hall and some of the fountains. The city Information Bureau for the exhibition, and tourism, continued at Argyle Street/St Enoch Square, Glasgow for many decades.

In December 2007, Digital Design Studio at Glasgow School of Art created a 3D graphic reconstruction of the 1938 exhibition, sourced from contemporary photographs, film footage, sketches and drawings from the archive of the Mitchell Library, amongst other sources. In 2010, the Digital Design Studio was awarded a further research grant to enhance the 3D model for public engagement. The Glasgow School of Art's YouTube channel contains several videos of the 3D model.

Bellahouston Park, with its parklands and gardens, continues in popularity with its entrances from Paisley Road West, Dumbreck Road and Mosspark Boulevard. The Palace of Arts, Bellahouston Sports Centre and the dry ski and snowboard slopes are established centres of fitness and recreation. The acclaimed House for an Art Lover, built in the 1990s to the 1901 designs of Charles Rennie Mackintosh is a major attraction and function venue, adjoined to the flower gardens, sculpture park and art studios. Nearby on the park nurseries is the modern Prince & Princess of Wales Hospice, opened in 2018.

The Beresford Hotel opened in 1938 to provide accommodation for those attending the Empire Exhibition and was often described as Glasgow's first skyscraper, being the tallest building erected in Glasgow between the two world wars, at 10 storeys high. The building now consists of 112 private residences but remains one of the city's most notable examples of Art Deco/Streamline Moderne architecture. and is protected as a category B listed building.

See also
 International Exhibition of Science, Art and Industry (1888)
 Glasgow International Exhibition (1901)
 Scottish Exhibition of National History, Art and Industry (1911)
 Glasgow Garden Festival (1988)

References

Further reading
Primary sources
Empire Exhibition - Official Guide softback 230 pages, plus photographs of sponsors and creators, plans and 73pp adverts
Empire Exhibition - Official Catalogue hardback 254 pages, including all committees and exhibitors, plus pp45
Empire Exhibition Final Report 11 January 1939, by Captain Graham, General Manager. 185pp
 Design, Politics and Commerce: International Exhibitions 1851-1951 listing of relevant resources in Glasgow University Library
 
 A collection of material relating to the Empire Exhibition held at Bellahouston Park, Glasgow between May and October 1938 at The Mitchell Library.

Secondary sources
Sir Cecil Weir KCMG, KBE, MC. (1953) - Civilian Assignment
The Town & Country Planning Association (1941) - Replanning Scotland, contributors Sir Cecil Weir, Sir Steven Bilsland, Sir Walter Elliot and others
Perilla Kinchin and Juliet Kinchin (1988) - Glasgow's Great Exhibitions: 1888, 1901, 1911, 1938, 1988 
Bob Crampsey  (1988) The Empire Exhibition of 1938 - The Last Durbar   159p.
 Graham Moss (1988) The Post Office and the Empire Exhibition, 1938. 60p.
Alastair Borthwick (1988) - The Empire Exhibition - Fifty Years On, published by BBC Scotland
Johnston, Ian (2008). Edit. Glasgow's Greatest Exhibition. Recreating the 1938 Empire Exhibition. Edinburgh : RIAS. .

External links
Selection of the National Library of Scotland's Moving Image Archive archive films about the Empire Exhibition in Glasgow, 1938. Notably Empire Exhibition by Don McLachlan, colour 9 minutes; Empire Exhibition filmed by McKenzie and McRobert, colour 18 minutes; and Exteriors and Interiors black and white 9 minutes.
Empire Exhibition, Scotland 1938 - 3D reconstruction of the exhibition by the Digital Design Studio at Glasgow School of Art

1938 in Scotland
World's fairs in Glasgow
Culture in Glasgow
Buildings and structures in Glasgow
History of Glasgow
Demolished buildings and structures in Scotland
Scotland and the British Empire
Colonial exhibitions
1938 in the British Empire
1930s in Glasgow